Make It with You is a 2020 Philippine romantic comedy-drama television series broadcast by ABS-CBN. Directed by Cathy Garcia-Molina, it stars Enrique Gil and Liza Soberano. The series aired on the network's Primetime Bida evening block and worldwide via The Filipino Channel from January 13 to March 13, 2020, replacing Starla and was replaced by Ang sa Iyo ay Akin.

History
Make It with You was aired on ABS-CBN's Primetime Bida evening block every weeknights at 8:45 P.M. from January 13 to March 13, 2020 for a total of 45 episodes. Due to the enhanced community quarantine in Luzon caused by the COVID-19 pandemic in the Philippines, the drama was put on halt and was replaced by reruns of On the Wings of Love beginning March 16, 2020 until ceasing its free-to-air broadcast operations on May 5, 2020.

Cancellation
On June 4, 2020, it was announced that Make It with You was among the series cancelled, along with Pamilya Ko. This happened a month after ABS-CBN ceased its free-to-air broadcast operations on May 5, 2020, due to the cease and desist order issued by the National Telecommunications Commission (NTC) and Solicitor General Jose Calida. Director Theodore Boborol stated that "ABS-CBN was already badly hit by the pandemic, and then suffered a double blow when its renewal was not granted."

Cast

Main cast
 Enrique Gil as Gabriel "Gabo" Villarica
 Liza Soberano as Belinda "Billy" Dimagiba

Supporting cast
 Eddie Gutierrez as Agapito "Aga" Dimagiba
 Ian Veneracion as Theodore "Ted" Villarica
 Pokwang as Jessica "Jess" Villarica
 Herbert Bautista as Antonio "Tony" Dimagiba
 Katya Santos as Helen Catapang
 Fumiya Sankai as Yuta Himura
 Khalil Ramos as Stephen "Sputnik" Perez
 Katarina Rodriguez as Rio Isla
 Jeremiah Lisbo as Xian Isla
 Riva Quenery as Cassandra Dimagiba
 Vangie Labalan as Iluminada "Iling" Dimagiba
 Anthony Jennings as Rhamboy de Asis
 Daniela Stranner as Cheska Crismo
 Hero Bautista as Monsy Dimagiba
 Jong Cuenco as David Guiterrez

Guest cast
 Cindy Kurleto as Raquel Villarica
 Candy Pangilinan as Mariel Montengro-Dimagiba
 Richard Quan as Collin Yang
 Kristine Abbey as Vlogger
 Syra Mulleno as Elsa

Production
Make It with You was the very first Philippine drama series to be filmed in Croatia.

Reception

See also
 List of programs broadcast by ABS-CBN
 List of ABS-CBN drama series

References

External links
 
 

ABS-CBN drama series
Television series by Star Creatives
2020 Philippine television series debuts
2020 Philippine television series endings
2020s Philippine television series
Filipino-language television shows
Television shows filmed in the Philippines
Television shows filmed in Croatia
Television productions cancelled due to the COVID-19 pandemic